Jeanne is a 1934 French drama film directed by Georges Marret and starring Gaby Morlay, André Luguet and Hélène Perdrière.

The film's art direction was by Eugène Lourié.

Cast
 Gaby Morlay as Madeleine Préolier  
 André Luguet as André Savignolle  
 Hélène Perdrière as Evodie  
 Robert Vattier as Charles Fuqui  
 Sinoël as M. Vieuville  
 Jeanne Lion as Mme. Savignole  
 Andrée Ducret as Mme. Vieuville  
 Nadia Sibirskaïa as La jeune fille  
 Marcelle Barry as Charlotte  
 Ariane Borg as Françoise  
 Claire Gérard as Mme. Gageret  
 Pierre Finaly as M. Gageret  
 Julien Clément as Le médecin  
 Jeanne Lamy 
 Claude Borelli

References

Bibliography 
 Maurice Bessy, André Bernard & Raymond Chirat. Histoire du cinéma français: 1951-1955. Pygmalion, 1989.

External links 
 

1934 films
1930s French-language films
French drama films
1934 drama films
French black-and-white films
1930s French films